Anh Tông is the temple name for several emperors of Vietnam, derived from the Chinese equivalent Yīngzōng. It may refer to:

Lý Anh Tông (1136–1175, reigned 1138–1175), emperor of the Lý dynasty
Trần Anh Tông (1276–1320, reigned 1293–1314), emperor of the Trần dynasty
Lê Anh Tông (1532–1573, reigned 1556–1573), emperor of the Lê dynasty

See also
Yingzong (disambiguation), Chinese equivalent

Temple name disambiguation pages